Ozomatli is the debut studio album by the American rock band Ozomatli, released on June 16, 1998, by Almo Sounds. The song "Cut Chemist Suite" was featured on the soundtrack for Tony Hawk's Pro Skater 3.

Track listing
 "Como Ves" (Jesus Perez) – 3:57
 "Cut Chemist Suite" (Willy Abers, Charlie Stewart) – 4:32
 "Cumbia de los Muertos" (Raúl Pacheco, Asdru Sierra, Stewart) – 3:32
 "¿Dónde Se Fueron?" (Pacheco, Sierra) – 4:18
 "Eva" (Ulises Bella, Jose Espinoza, Pacheco) – 3:09
 "O Le Le" (Abers, Bella, Carlos Guaico, Stewart) – 4:59
 "Chango" (Justin Porée, Sierra) – 4:28
 "Super Bowl Sundae" (Abers, Sierra, Stewart) – 4:45
 "Aquí No Será" (Enrique Ramirez) – 4:19
 "Chota" (Abers, Oskar Cartaya, Pacheco, Sierra, Stewart) – 3:47
 "Coming War" (Abers, Bella, Pacheco, Sierra, Stewart) – 3:56
 "La Misma Canción" (Pablo Castorena, Pacheco) – 4:05

Holland Bonus Tracks
"Cut Chemist Suite (Unplugged)" (Abers, Stewart) – 6:47
"Como Ves (Unplugged)" (Perez) – 2:58

Personnel
Ozomatli
Wil-Dog Abers – bass, vocals
Ulises Bella – clarinet, guitar, tenor saxophone, vocals
Chali 2na – rap
Cut Chemist – turntables
Raúl Pacheco – guitar, vocals
Justin Porée – percussion
Asdru Sierra – trumpet, vocals
Jiro Yamaguchi – tabla, cajón, other percussion, vocals

Additional musicians
Jose Espinoza – alto saxophone
Carlos Guaico – guitar, Fender Rhodes
David Hidalgo – accordion
Paul Livingstone – guitar
Tony Lujan – trumpet
William Marrufo – drums
David Ralicke – trombone, baritone saxophone

Technical personnel
John Ewing, Jr. – assistant engineer
Jay Gordon – assistant engineer
Stephen Marcussen – mastering
Tony Maxwell – direction
Ozomatli – producing
Anton Pukshansky – engineer, mixing
Luis Ramirez – logo
Tom Recchion – art direction, design
Patrick Shevelin – mixing
T-Ray – producing, mixing

Chart performance
Ozomatli made its way to [[Billboard charts|Billboard'''s]] Latin charts, peaking at number 7 on the Latin Albums chart and at number 4 on the Latin Pop Albums chart. The album spent 71 and 50 weeks on these charts, respectively. Ozomatli also made an appearance on Billboard'''s Heatseekers chart, peaking at number 25.

References

1998 debut albums
Ozomatli albums
Almo Sounds albums